Malik Leon Tillman (born May 28, 2002) is a professional soccer player who plays as an attacking midfielder for Scottish Premiership club Rangers, on loan from Bayern Munich. Born in Germany, he represents the United States national team.

Tillman is a graduate of Bayern Munich's youth system, which he joined in 2015 from Greuther Fürth. He made his debut for Bayern's first-team in August 2021, having previously featured for Bayern Munich II. He signed for Rangers on loan in July 2022.

Tillman represented both his country of birth, Germany, and the United States at youth international level. He made his senior international debut for the United States in June 2022.

Club career 
Born in Nuremberg, Tillman was part of the youth squad at Greuther Fürth before joining Bayern Munich along with his brother Timothy Tillman in 2015. He was quickly promoted to the under-19 squad after putting in good performances for the under-17s.

Tillman made his professional debut on June 9, 2020, when he came on as a substitute for Bayern Munich II, the club's reserve side, against Zwickau. He started and played 57 minutes as Bayern Munich II won 2–0.

He was promoted to Bayern Munich's senior team during the first round of the 2021–22 DFB-Pokal against Bremer SV on August 25, 2021. He came on as a substitute at the start of the second half and scored a goal in the 12–0 victory.

He made his Champions League debut on December 8, 2021, coming on as a substitute late in the second half against FC Barcelona.

On July 15, 2022, Tillman joined Scottish club Rangers on a season long loan, with the club having an exclusive option to buy. He made his debut for the club against Scottish Premiership side Livingston, as a second-half substitute, during a 2–1 win on July 30. He scored his first goal for Rangers in a UEFA Champions League qualifier against Belgian side Union Saint-Gilloise on August 9 and followed this by netting the opening goal in a 4–0 league victory at home over St Johnstone three days later.

International career 
Tillman was initially eligible to represent both Germany, his birth nation, and the United States, through his father. He played youth international soccer for the United States at under-15 level and Germany at under-15, under-16, under-17, under-20 and under-21 levels.

In May 2022, Tillman applied for a one-time switch to play for the United States national team. On May 31, the switch was approved by FIFA. The next day, he made his senior debut for the United States in a 3–0 win in a friendly match against Morocco.

Personal life 
Tillman is a dual national of the United States and Germany, due to his father being American and his mother German. Tillman has an older brother, Timothy, who currently plays professionally with Major League Soccer  club Los Angeles FC. Both brothers played for the Greuther Fürth and Bayern Munich academies, graduating from the latter.

Career statistics

Club

International

Honors 
Bayern Munich
 Bundesliga: 2021–22
 DFL-Supercup: 2020
 UEFA Super Cup: 2020

References

External links 
 

2002 births
Living people
Footballers from Nuremberg
American soccer players
United States men's international soccer players
United States men's youth international soccer players
German footballers
Germany youth international footballers
Germany under-21 international footballers
Association football midfielders
American people of German descent
German people of African-American descent
FC Bayern Munich footballers
FC Bayern Munich II players
3. Liga players
Bundesliga players
Scottish Professional Football League players
Rangers F.C. players
American expatriate soccer players
Expatriate footballers in Scotland